Something Old, Something New, Something Blue, Somethin' Else is a rock and roll album by the Crickets. It is The Crickets' third release following the departure and subsequent death of their front man, Buddy Holly.  As the original cover indicates, the album contains versions of four old songs, four new songs, and four songs with variations of "blue" in the title.

Originally released as an LP record on in December 1962, the album was re-released on CD in 1994, with bonus tracks not featured on the original album and a new album cover.  In the UK an EP titled Straight - No Strings! was issued on Liberty (LEP 2094) featuring four tracks from this album: "Willie and the Hand Jive", "Summertime Blues", "Searchin'" and "What'd I Say".

Background
Following the band's successful collaboration with singer Bobby Vee, released earlier in 1962, singer, songwriter, and guitarist Sonny Curtis was able to rejoin the group. The band now consisted of guitarist Curtis, singer Jerry Naylor, pianist Glen Hardin, and original member and drummer Jerry Allison.

Reception

Billboard called the album that "a fine outing for the boys by themeselves, following their recent chart album entry with (Bobby) Vee," adding that "[t]he boys could go places with this strong wax."

Reissues
The 1994 CD re-release includes bonus tracks culled from the 1971 compilation Rock Reflections.  A streaming version available on platforms like Spotify resequences the albums' tracks and adds a 1960 version of "Love's Made a Fool of You", while versions of the album posted to YouTube anachronistically resequence the album according to the listing of songs on the album's cover.

Track listing

Personnel 
The Crickets
 Jerry Allison – drums, backing vocals
 Sonny Curtis -guitar, vocals
 Glen D. Hardin -piano
 Jerry Naylor – guitar, lead vocals 

Additional personnel
 Eddie Brackett - engineer
 Jim Economides - engineer
 Snuff Garrett - producer

References

External links

1963 albums
The Crickets albums
Liberty Records albums
Albums produced by Snuff Garrett